An InCONvenient Truth is the third album by the Norwegian urban music duo Madcon. It was released in December 2008. It peaked at number 8 on the Norwegian Albums Chart.

Track listing

Personnel
Bass guitar - Jonny Sjo (tracks: 1, 2, 4 to 8, 10 to 12)
Drums - Kim Ofstad
Instruments - Hitesh Ceon
Mastered by Bjørn Engelmann*
Producer - 3Elementz
Recorded and mixed by 3Elementz
Written by Hitesh Ceon, Jonny Sjo, Kim Ofstad, Sofian Benzaim* (tracks: 9), Tshawe Baqwa, Yosef Wolde-Mariam

Source: www.discogs.com

Chart performance

References

2008 albums
Madcon albums